RAB30, member RAS oncogene family is a protein that in humans is encoded by the RAB30 gene.

References

Further reading

External links 
 PDBe-KB provides an overview of all the structure information available in the PDB for Human Ras-related protein Rab-30